Thomas Rust Underwood (March 3, 1898June 29, 1956) was an American  politician who served Kentucky in the United States House of Representatives and in the United States Senate.

Early life
Thomas Rust Underwood was born in Hopkinsville, Kentucky on March 3, 1891. He attended public schools and graduated from the University of Kentucky in 1917. During World War I, Underwood served in the Students Army Training Corps at the University of Kentucky.

Career
Underwood worked as the general manager of the Lexington Herald from 1931 to 1935 and editor from 1935 to 1936. He was a member of the Kentucky state planning board from 1931 to 1935 and secretary of the state racing commission from 1931 to 1943 and 1947 to 1947. He was secretary of the National Association of State Racing Commissioners from 1934 to 1948. He then served as the assistant to the director of the Office of Economic Stabilization in 1943.

He was elected as a Democrat to the Eighty-first Congress; he was reelected to the Eighty-second Congress and served from January 3, 1949, until his resignation on March 17, 1951.

Underwood was appointed on March 19, 1951, to the United States Senate as a Democrat to fill the vacancy in the term ending January 3, 1955, caused by the death of Virgil Chapman and served from March 19, 1951, to November 4, 1952.  He sought to retain the seat in the 1952 special election but lost to John Sherman Cooper.

After his stint in the Senate, Underwood went back to his editorial duties with the Lexington Herald.

Death
Underwood died in Lexington, Kentucky on June 29, 1956. He was interred at Lexington Cemetery.

References

1898 births
1956 deaths
People from Hopkinsville, Kentucky
University of Kentucky alumni
American people of English descent
Democratic Party members of the United States House of Representatives from Kentucky
Democratic Party United States senators from Kentucky
Politicians from Lexington, Kentucky
20th-century American politicians